Sergei Sergeyevich Boyko (born 14 September 1971) is a Russian professional association football coach and a former player.

Boyko was born in a family of a Ukrainian father and a Russian mother.

References

External links
 
 

1971 births
Living people
Sportspeople from Kyiv Oblast
Russian people of Ukrainian descent
Russian footballers
Russian football managers
Association football midfielders
FC Lida players
FC Nosta Novotroitsk players
FC Znamya Truda Orekhovo-Zuyevo managers
FC Ararat Yerevan managers
Russian expatriate football managers
Kaluga State University alumni
Russian expatriate footballers
Expatriate footballers in Belarus
FC Torpedo Minsk players
FC Slavia Mozyr players